Der Bäbu  (The Baboo) is a Comic opera in three acts by Heinrich Marschner. The German libretto by Wilhelm August Wohlbrück (Marschner's brother-in-law) is based on the book The Baboo and Other Tales Descriptive of Society in India, Smith, Elder, and Co., London 1834 by Augustus Prinsep. The first performance took place on 19 February 1838 in Hanover.

Roles

Instrumentation
Marschner scored the opera for two piccolos and two flutes (not doubling), two oboes, two clarinets, two bassoons, four horns, three trombones, timpani, tamtam, and strings.

Recordings
 Overtura

References
Notes

Sources
Allen Dean Palmer, Heinrich August Marschner, 1795–1861: His life and stage works. Ann Arbor 1980
John Warrack and Ewan West. The Oxford Dictionary of Opera. Oxford University Press 1992 
Brigitta Weber, Heinrich Marschner. Königlicher Hofkapellmeister in Hannover. Hannover: Niedersächsische Staatstheater 1995. (Prinzenstraße. 5)

External links
 Der Bäbu – Neuburger Kammeroper 2018

Operas by Heinrich Marschner
Operas
Singspiele
German-language operas
1838 operas
Operas set in India